The Ethiopian International Film Festival (EIFF) is an Ethiopian film festival that began in 2005 and organized by Linkage Arts Resource Center annually in Addis Ababa. Like to Addis International Film Festival, the EIFF aimed toward Ethiopian and African film industry.

Overview
Linkage Arts Resource Center established in April 2000. Since the establishment in 2005, the festival has been grown into dealing with international film firms. 

During week of screenings in November, appropriately 100 feature, shorts, fiction, documentary, animation, experimental, classics and contemporary films around the world shown. All screenings are in public space and filmmakers introduce their work and organize workshops and seminar in practice or theory. Best films of the year have 10 categories and the nominees are presented in opening ceremony, and the winners announced in closing ceremony. The Ethiopian International Film Festival is considered equivalent version of the American Academy Award.

Notable events
The 7th Ethiopian International Film Festival was held in Addis Ababa from 26 November to 2 December 2012. The theme of the festival "Many Dreams, One Vision" coined after 50th anniversary of the establishment of the African Union. Following announcements and calls for participation in FM radios and private newspapers, films from Africa, Europe, Asia, North and South America have participated on the festival. The festival was sponsored by AMA Art Moves Africa, Hubert3 Balls Fund, Cinema Mondial Tour & Jan Vrijmann.

References

Ethiopian film awards
Film festivals in Ethiopia